Artem Tetenko (born 12 February 1991) is a Ukrainian football goalkeeper who played for FC Shakhtar Donetsk in the Ukrainian Premier League.

External links 
Profile at Official Shakhtar website

Ukrainian footballers
FC Shakhtar Donetsk players
Association football goalkeepers
1991 births
Living people
People from Stakhanov, Ukraine
Sportspeople from Luhansk Oblast